The duggi, dugi or dukkar, is an Indian drum, with a kettle drum shape, played with fingers and the palm of the hand. It is used in baul music of the Bengal/Bangladesh region. It is also employed in folk music of Uttar Pradesh (duggi) and Punjab (dukkar).

In shehnai ensembles, a duggi player provided rhythm accompaniment, but nowadays, a tabla player has the role. The duggi part in those ensembles consists of two drums, like a tabla and bayan, but smaller in size. The duggi has neither the resounding quality of the tabla nor the peculiarity that the tabla has of sustaining the frequencies of a note.

External links
Video - Bismillah shehnai ensemble. Percussionist on the right side is playing duggi
Video - Duggi in baul music

References

 Photo

Hand drums
Asian percussion instruments
Indian musical instruments